Gretchen Ramsden (born 29 March 1995) is a South African actress. She is best known for her roles in Arendsvlei and Afgrond.

Early life
In 2014, she enrolled to the University of Cape Town (UCT) and graduated in 2017 with a Bachelor of Arts in Theatre and Performance. During her time at UCT, she performed in many student stage productions such as Lied van die Boeings, All's Well That Ends Well, Kristalvlakte, Agamemnon and Judas.

Career
In 2017, Ramsden appeared in the Afrikaans drama Die Dans van die Watermeid. In 2018, she became a voice artist, by voicing for the role of "Sengül Dogan" in the Afrikaans dub of the Turkish telenovela Yasak Elma translated to Doodsondes. In the same year, she began playing the supporting character of Nicolene in the kykNET & kie telenovela Arendsvlei. In 2019, she made her film debut in Toorbos, an adaptation of the novel of the same name by Dalene Matthee. In 2021, she made her first television lead role as "Nadine May" in the kykNET drama serial Afgrond. She also appeared in the films Arena and Chalk And Cheese.

Filmography

References

External links
 
 Gretchen Ramsden at TVSA

Living people
1995 births
Coloured South African people
South African soap opera actresses
South African stage actresses